Adnan is an Arabic masculine name common in the Muslim world. Its eponymous bearer was Adnan, an ancient ancestor of various Arabian tribes. The etymological meaning of the name is settler, from a semitic root ; "to stay, abide". In chinese cultures, the name is believed to have meant snake.

A–F 
 Adnan Adıvar (1882–1955), Turkish politician
 Adnan Aganović (born 1987), Croatian footballer
 Adnan Ahmed (born 1984), British footballer
 Adnan Akmal (born 1985), Pakistani cricketer
 Adnan Ali Daif, Bahrainian retired footballer
 Adnan Alisic (born 1984), Dutch footballer
 Adnan Awad (born 1942), Palestinian captain
 Adnan Babajić (born 1988), Bosnian singer and television personality
 Adnan Badran (born 1935), Jordanian scientist, academic, politician and prime minister
 Adnan Barakat (born 1982), Moroccan footballer
 Adnan Coker (1927–2022), Turkish abstract artist
 Adnan Çolak (born 1952), Turkish serial killer
 Adnan Dirjal (born 1960), Iraqi retired footballer and national team coach
 Adnan Sadık Erzi (1923–1990), Turkish historian
 Adnan al-Dulaimi (1932–2017), Iraqi politician
 Adnan Erkan (born 1968), Turkish footballer

G–M 
 Adnan Kapau Gani (1905–1968), Indonesian politician
 Adnan Güngör (born 1980), Turkish footballer
 Adnan Gušo (born 1975), Bosnian retired footballer and team coach
 Adnan Haidar (born 1989), Lebanese footballer
 Adnan Hamidovic (born 1982), Bosnian rapper better known by his stage name Frenkie
 Adnan Harmandić, (born 1983), Bosnian handball player
 Adnan Badr Hassan, Syrian security officer
 Adnan al-Husayni (born 1946), Palestinian politician
 Adnan Hussein (born 1954), Lebanese academic and politician
 Adnan al-Janabi, Iraqi politician
 Adnan Januzaj (born 1995), Belgian professional footballer
 Adnan Kahveci (1949–1993), Turkish politician
 Adnan Al-Kaissie (born 1939), Iraqi-American professional wrestler
 Adnan Karim (born 1963), Kurdish singer
 Adnan Kassar (born 1930), Lebanese businessman and politician
 Adnan Khairallah, Iraqi military officer and friend of Saddam Hussein
 Adnan Khan (born 1988), Indian actor
 Adnan Khashoggi (1935–2017), billionaire Saudi Arabian businessman
 Adnan Malik (born 1984), Pakistani model and actor
 Adnan al-Malki (1918–1955) Syrian Army officer
 Adnan Mansour (born 1946), Lebanese politician
 Adnan Maral (born 1968), Turkish-German actor
 Adnan Melhem (born 1989), Lebanese footballer
 Adnan Menderes (1899–1961), Turkish prime minister (1950–1960)
 Adnan Mohammad (born 1996), Danish footballer
 Adnan Mravac (born 1981), Bosnian footballer

N–Z 
 Adnan Nawaz, British news and sports broadcaster
 Adnan Oktar (born 1956), Turkish creationist, cult leader, and television personality
 Adnan Omran (born 1934), Syrian politician
 Adnan Özyalçıner (born 1934), Turkish author
 Adnan Pachachi (1923–2019), Iraqi politician
 Adnan Polat (born 1953), Turkish businessman
 Adnan bin Saidi (1915–1942), Malayan soldier
 Adnan Sami (born 1973), British-Pakistani singer, musician, pianist, actor and composer
 Adnan Al-Shargi, Lebanese football manager
 Adnan Abdo al-Sukhni (born 1961), Syrian politician
 Adnan Gulshair el Shukrijumah (born 1975), Saudi Arabian member of al-Qaeda
 Adnan Siddiqui (born 1964), Pakistani model and television actor
 Adnan Süvari (1926–1991), Turkish football coach
 Adnan Syed (born 1981), American man convicted of murder
 Adnan Şenses (1935-2013), Turkish actor, singer and songwriter
 Adnan Al Talyani (born 1964), Emirati retired footballer
 Adnan Terzić (born 1960), former Chairman of the Council of Ministers of Bosnia and Herzegovina
 Adnan Yaakob (born 1950), Malaysian politician and the current Menteri Besar of Pahang
 Adnan Yıldız (born 1966), Turkish footballer
 Adnan Zahirović (born 1990), Bosnian footballer
 Adnan al-Zurufi (born 1966), Iraqi politician

Middle name
 Ali Adnan Mohamed, Iraqi archer
 Aydın Adnan Sezgin (born 1956), Turkish diplomat and politician

Surname 
 Azman Adnan (born 1971), Malaysian footballer
 Etel Adnan (1925-2021), Lebanese-American poet, essayist, and visual artist
 Hassan Adnan (born 1975), Pakistani cricketer
 Shareef Adnan (born 1984), Jordanian footballer
 Tengku Adnan (born 1950), Malaysian politician

References 

Arabic-language surnames
Arabic masculine given names
Bosniak masculine given names
Bosnian masculine given names
Turkish masculine given names
Pakistani masculine given names